

Overview 
Fengdu railway station is a railway station in Fengdu County, Chongqing, on the Chongqing–Lichuan railway. It is operated by the China Railway Corporation. The station opened on 28 December 2013.

Services 
Within the station, there are various facilities for patrons including restrooms, limited food facilities, ticketing desks, a small outdoor plaza with seating, and a large parking lot. Parking is limited during business days due to commuter traffic.

Some facilities such as food and ticketing do not operate after 18:00 local time. During periods of high traffic, such as local Fengdu events, station facilities may open early and remain open later. All modified operation times are at made at the discretion of station management.

Attractions 
Fengdu station is a railway station is the closest station on the Chongqing–Lichuan for attractions such as Shuangguishang Forest, the town of Fengdu, and Fengdu Ghost City shrine.

References

Railway stations in Chongqing